Peng Yang (178–214), courtesy name Yongnian, was an official serving under the warlord Liu Bei during the late Eastern Han dynasty of China.

Early life
Peng Yang was from Guanghan Commandery (廣漢郡), which is around present-day Guanghan, Sichuan. Described as a man about eight chi tall and having an impressive appearance, he was notorious for being conceited, arrogant, rude and condescending towards others. Among his contemporaries, he respected only Qin Mi, who was also from Guanghan Commandery. He once recommended Qin Mi as a talent to Xu Jing, who was then the Administrator of Guanghan. In his recommendation letter, he compared Qin Mi to ancient sages such as Fu Yue, Jiang Ziya and Li Yiji, and praised Qin Mi for his virtuous, loyal, sincere and humble behaviour.

Peng Yang later served as an official in his native Yi Province (covering present-day Sichuan and Chongqing) but never made it to any position higher than that of a scribe (書佐). His offensive behaviour also landed him in deep trouble when his colleagues slandered him in front of Liu Zhang, the Governor of Yi Province. Liu Zhang believed them and ordered Peng Yang to be shaved bald, put in chains, and sent to perform hard labour.

Service under Liu Bei
In 211, when the warlord Liu Bei led his forces into Yi Province to assist Liu Zhang in countering a rival warlord Zhang Lu in Hanzhong, Peng Yang travelled north to find Liu Bei in the hope of joining him. He paid a visit to Pang Tong, one of Liu Bei's key advisers. When Peng Yang showed up at his house, Pang Tong was entertaining other guests as well, but Peng Yang did not care and he went straight to Pang Tong's seat and sat there comfortably. He told Pang Tong: "I will only speak to you when all your other guests have left." After the other guests left, Peng Yang demanded that Pang Tong serve him food before they started talking. Peng Yang also stayed at Pang Tong's house for days and had long conversations with him. Pang Tong was so impressed with Peng Yang that he recommended him as a talent to Liu Bei. Fa Zheng, another of Liu Bei's key advisers, had heard of Peng Yang's talent so he also recommended Peng Yang to his lord.

Liu Bei saw Peng Yang as an extraordinary talent and immediately recruited him. He often assigned Peng Yang the tasks of relaying military orders, and guiding and instructing his officers. Peng Yang performed his tasks well and became increasingly favoured by Liu Bei.

In 214, after Liu Bei seized control of Yi Province from Liu Zhang and became the new Governor of Yi Province, he appointed Peng Yang as an Assistant Officer in the Headquarters Office (治中從事) of Yi Province. As he had risen through the ranks to a position much higher than his previous appointment as a scribe, Peng Yang felt very smug about his achievements and started behaving in an arrogant manner towards others.

Zhuge Liang, Liu Bei's chief adviser, disliked Peng Yang but pretended to be accommodating and tolerant towards him. He secretly warned Liu Bei on numerous occasions that Peng Yang was a highly ambitious individual who might become a threat to them in the long term. As Liu Bei highly trusted Zhuge Liang and had been quietly observing Peng Yang's actions and behaviour, he believed Zhuge Liang was right so he started distancing himself from Peng Yang. Later, he sent Peng Yang away from Chengdu, Yi Province's capital, to serve as the Administrator of Jiangyang Commandery (江陽郡; around present-day Luzhou, Sichuan).

Downfall and execution
When Peng Yang learnt that he was going to be sent away from Chengdu to serve as a commandery administrator elsewhere, he felt very unhappy so he visited Ma Chao, one of Liu Bei's generals, and told him about it. Ma Chao asked him: "You are an outstanding talent. Our lord trusts and regards you highly. You should be serving him alongside people like Kongming and Xiaozhi. When you accept your reassignment to a small commandery, doesn't that take you further away from your initial goal(s)?" Peng Yang grumbled: "That old piece of leather is ridiculous and muddle-headed! What else can I say?" He also told Ma Chao: "You are outside while I am inside. The Empire can be pacified." His words were interpreted as asking Ma Chao to join him in plotting a coup d'état against Liu Bei.

As Ma Chao had only recently joined Liu Bei, he often feared that he would get into trouble so he did not respond even though he felt shocked after hearing what Peng Yang told him. After Peng Yang left, he secretly reported him to the authorities. As a result, Peng Yang was arrested and imprisoned for plotting treason against Liu Bei.

While awaiting his execution, Peng Yang wrote a letter to Zhuge Liang as follows: 

Peng Yang was 37 years old (by East Asian age reckoning) when he was executed.

See also
 Lists of people of the Three Kingdoms

Notes

References

 Chen, Shou (3rd century). Records of the Three Kingdoms (Sanguozhi).
 
 Pei, Songzhi (5th century). Annotations to Records of the Three Kingdoms (Sanguozhi zhu).
 

178 births
214 deaths
Liu Zhang and associates
Officials under Liu Bei
Han dynasty politicians from Sichuan
People executed by the Han dynasty
Executed Han dynasty people
Executed people from Sichuan